A disco ball (also known as a mirror ball or glitter ball) is a roughly spherical object that reflects light directed at it in many directions, producing a complex display. Its surface consists of hundreds or thousands of facets, nearly all of approximately the same shape and size, and each having a mirrored surface. Usually it is mounted well above the heads of the people present, suspended from a device that causes it to rotate steadily on a vertical axis and illuminated by spotlights, so that stationary viewers experience beams of light flashing over them, and see myriad spots of light spinning around the walls of the room.

Miniature glitter balls are sold as novelties and used for a number of decorative purposes, including dangling from the rear-view mirror of an automobile or Christmas tree ornaments. Glitter balls may have inspired a homemade version in the sparkleball, the American outsider craft of building decorative light balls out of Christmas lights and plastic cups.

History
What are now usually called "disco balls" were first widely used in nightclubs in the 1920s. They were patented in 1917. An early example can be seen in the nightclub sequence of Berlin: Die Sinfonie der Großstadt, a German silent film from 1927. In the 1960s, 1970s and 1980s, these devices were a standard piece of equipment in discothèques, and by the turn of the millennium, the name "disco ball" had grown quite popular. 

A Louisville, Kentucky company known as Omega National Products claims to have made 90% of the disco balls used in the United States during the disco craze, and remains a supplier.

Popular culture
The 1942 movie Casablanca featured a disco ball in a flashback sequence.

The English rock band Yes used a variant of the disco ball in their 1972 "Close to the Edge" tour. This was a slowly spinning vertical mirror disk mounted atop a tall ladder, with a single spotlight aimed at it, used for the opening and closing birds/waterfall-sounds sequences of the title song Close to the Edge.

The Grateful Dead featured a disco ball in the band's 1977 concert documentary The Grateful Dead Movie. The film includes several sequences where glittery reflections from a disco ball fill San Francisco's Winterland Ballroom during a series of 1974 performances. "A twirling mirror ball overhead also adds some visual flash to the image," notes a reviewer.

U2 also featured a lemon-shaped disco ball on their 1997 - 1998 PopMart Tour. The band entered the lemon disco ball at the end of the main set and emerged from the lemon disco ball at the start of their encore. The band also released promotional disco balls to promote the band's album Pop, the single "Discothèque", and lead singer Bono also sported the alter-ego of "Mirror Ball Man" during their 1992 tour Zoo TV Tour.

Introducing disco balls to a new concert demographic, the pop punk band Paramore showcased dozens of spinning disco balls in 2014 as a glittering stage backdrop during the band's 37-city US Monumentour. The same disco ball backdrop was used that year at the UK Reading and Leeds Festivals, where the band co-headlined.

The UK television series Strictly Come Dancing and US counterpart Dancing with the Stars award competition winners a "Glitter Ball Trophy".

Records
English rock band Pink Floyd used a glitter ball on their A Momentary Lapse of Reason Tour of 1987 and The Division Bell Tour of 1994. The glitter ball used on the former was somewhat larger than normal but nowhere near as large as the glitter ball used on the 1994 tour. This particular glitter ball is one of the largest in the world: 4.90 metres in diameter, it rises to a height of 21.3 metres before opening to a width of 7.3 metres, revealing a 12 kilowatt Phoebus HMI lamp. Both can be seen on the video of each tour, Delicate Sound of Thunder and Pulse, during the song "Comfortably Numb".

American singer-singwriter Madonna has used glitter balls in several of her tours. During The Girlie Show in 1993, she descended while sitting on one before performing "Express Yourself", and later in 2006, she used a 2-ton glitter ball that was embellished by 2 million dollars' worth of Swarovski crystals, which used an hydraulic system to open like flower petals for her entrance during her Confessions Tour.

Despite claims that the world's largest disco ball can be found on the promenade in Blackpool, United Kingdom, it is smaller than the Guinness World Record holder.

References 

Lighting
Mirrors
Dance equipment
Ball